The Georgia Southern Eagles baseball team is the intercollegiate baseball team representing Georgia Southern University. It began in 1933. The program competes in NCAA Division I. The team is led by head coach Rodney Hennon, who is in his 22nd
year at Georgia Southern. The Eagles are part of the Sun Belt Conference.

Team highlights
The team went to the College World Series in 1973 and 1990 and has appeared in 13 NCAA regionals. The Eagles were the NAIA National Champions in 1962, sweeping Portland State. The Eagles have won 8 SoCon Championships, coming in 1993, 1996, 1997, 2000, 2001, 2002, 2009 and, most recently, in 2011, when they beat Samford University 1–0. In 2008, the Eagles set an NCAA record when they hit 14 home runs in a single game. In 2022, the Eagles were selected to host a Regional, the first in school history.

J. I. Clements Stadium

J. I. Clements Stadium, built in 2005, is the home venue of the program. It is named after former Eagles coach J. I. Clements and has a capacity of 3,000 spectators.

Retired numbers
 #1 (former head coach Jack Stallings)
 #20 (All-America Todd Greene)

Notable players
 Everett Teaford (Kansas City Royals)
 Victor Roache, All-American outfielder
 Eric Phillips, (Toronto Blue Jays )

See also
List of NCAA Division I baseball programs

References

External links